A referendum on sessions of Fono was held in American Samoa on 7 November 1978.  Voters were asked to approve a proposed amendment which would elongate sessions of Fono from 30 days to 45 days. The measure was approved and entered into law.

References

Referendums in American Samoa
1978 in American Samoa
American Samoa